Ono is a Papuan language spoken in Morobe Province, Papua New Guinea. It is spoken as a second language by a couple thousand speakers of related languages.

References

Languages of Morobe Province
Huon languages